Waldseemüller Rock, Snow Island
 Wild Knoll, Bastien Range
 Willan Saddle, Livingston Island 
 Wörner Gap, Livingston Island  
 Wulfila Glacier, Greenwich Island

See also 
 Bulgarian toponyms in Antarctica

External links 
 Bulgarian Antarctic Gazetteer
 SCAR Composite Gazetteer of Antarctica
 Antarctic Digital Database (ADD). Scale 1:250000 topographic map of Antarctica with place-name search.
 L. Ivanov. Bulgarian toponymic presence in Antarctica. Polar Week at the National Museum of Natural History in Sofia, 2–6 December 2019

Bibliography 
 J. Stewart. Antarctica: An Encyclopedia. Jefferson, N.C. and London: McFarland, 2011. 1771 pp.  
 L. Ivanov. Bulgarian Names in Antarctica. Sofia: Manfred Wörner Foundation, 2021. Second edition. 539 pp.  (in Bulgarian)
 G. Bakardzhieva. Bulgarian toponyms in Antarctica. Paisiy Hilendarski University of Plovdiv: Research Papers. Vol. 56, Book 1, Part A, 2018 – Languages and Literature, pp. 104-119 (in Bulgarian)
 L. Ivanov and N. Ivanova. Bulgarian names. In: The World of Antarctica. Generis Publishing, 2022. pp. 114-115. 

Antarctica
 
Bulgarian toponyms in Antarctica
 Names of places in Antarctica